City House and The Olympic is a cancelled residential skyscraper complex proposed for the southeast corner of South Grand Avenue and West Olympic Boulevard in Los Angeles, California. It was designed by Robertson Partners, and developed by The Titan Organization.

See also
List of tallest buildings in Los Angeles

References

Residential skyscrapers in Los Angeles
Unbuilt buildings and structures in the United States